The Brave Little Toaster is a 1987 American animated musical film directed by Jerry Rees. It is based on the 1980 novella of the same name by Thomas M. Disch. The film stars Deanna Oliver, Timothy E. Day, Jon Lovitz, Tim Stack, and Thurl Ravenscroft, with Wayne Kaatz, Colette Savage, Phil Hartman, Joe Ranft, and Jim Jackman in supporting roles. It is set in a world where domestic appliances and other consumer electronics come to life, pretending to be lifeless in the presence of humans. The story focuses on five anthropomorphic household appliances, which include a toaster, a lamp stand, a blanket, a radio and a vacuum cleaner, who go on a quest to search for their owner.

The film was produced by Hyperion Pictures and The Kushner-Locke Company. Many CalArts graduates, including the original members of Pixar Animation Studios, were involved with this film. The rights to the book were acquired by Walt Disney Studios in 1982. John Lasseter, then employed at Disney, wanted to do a computer-animated film based on it, but it was turned down. While the film received a limited theatrical release, The Brave Little Toaster received positive reviews and was popular on home video. It was followed by two sequels, The Brave Little Toaster to the Rescue in 1997 and The Brave Little Toaster Goes to Mars in 1998.

Plot

In a small wooden cottage known as Peaceful Woodland Cottage, five members of a clan of small electric appliances – Toaster, Radio, a lamp stand named "Lampy", an electric blanket named "Blanky" and a vacuum cleaner named "Kirby" – await the return of a young boy named Rob (whom they refer to as the Helpful Master) who used to vacation at the cottage with his family, but the family has not come by in many years. Then one day in July, upon seeing that the cottage is about to be sold, the appliances decide to venture out and find Rob themselves. They turn Kirby into a lawn tractor by attaching a rolling office chair, a power strip and a Junko car battery for a power source to him and travel via Kirby, and Radio serves as navigator by directing the group toward urban radio signals he picks up.

Along their journey, the appliances have numerous harrowing adventures. At one point, when their battery is nearly dead, the group stops for the night in a forest, with Blanky serving as a makeshift tent. During the night, a dark storm blows Blanky up into the scary trees, and Lampy uses himself as a lightning rod to recharge the battery. After recovering Blanky, the appliances try to cross a waterfall, but all of everyone except Kirby falls into the murky water below. Kirby dives in and rescues the others; but with the chair, strip and battery lost, the group resorts to pulling the disabled Kirby through a swamp. They are almost swallowed up by a giant bog of  quicksand, but are saved by  Elmo St. Peters and his dog and taken to the appliance parts store, where they witness Elmo stabbing the blender to sell its motor to the goofy toothed customer. When Radio is about to be taken apart by the pyschopath for radio tubes, the others frighten Elmo by turning out to be a ghost. After Elmo is unconscious,  he gasps when he sees a  part of a door taken off, and the goofy toothed customer is not happy again. 

Rob, now a young adult, goes out to the cottage with his girlfriend Chris to retrieve the appliances to take with him to college. When the group arrives at Rob's family's apartment, their newer appliances – resentful about Rob wanting to take the older appliances instead of themselves – demonstrate how much more technologically advanced they are and throw the group out of the apartment and into a dumpster. Rob and Chris return home empty-handed; but an old black and white television in the apartment, a friend of the five appliances who formerly resided in the cottage with them, plays fictional advertisements for the junkyard the appliances have been taken to, in the hopes that Rob and Chris will go there to find them.

At the junkyard, the appliances are despondent that Rob apparently no longer needs them. They are picked up by a large electromagnet and are about to be destroyed by Elmo's crusher, but when they see Rob in the junkyard, they believe he might still need them after all. They make numerous attempts to escape the ravenous magnet and place themselves so Rob will find them, until the magnet picks up a huge pile of junk and spreads it along the conveyor belt leading to the crusher, separating the group. Rob spots all the appliances except Toaster on the conveyor belt, but the magnet picks up Rob as well as the appliances and drops them back on the belt. Toaster jumps into the crusher's gears and is sadly mangled,  just before it flattens Rob and the others. Back at the apartment, Rob repairs Toaster, and he and Chris soon depart for college with all five appliances in tow.

Voice cast
 Deanna Oliver as Toaster, a pop-up two-slice toaster who is the leader of the clan of minor electrical appliances. The main protagonist in the film, Toaster is courageous, intelligent, kind, thoughtful and warmhearted, and is the one who devises the idea of going on a journey to locate the appliances' master Rob. Though Toaster's gender is ambiguous in the film, most official sources describe Toaster as a male. Oliver originally auditioned for the voice of the Air Conditioner but was given the role of Toaster.
 Timothy E. Day as Blanky, an electric blanket with an innocent demeanor. Childlike and insecure, Blanky is the only appliance who is deeply distressed over Rob's absence and wants nothing more than to be reunited with him. Toaster and Blanky share a warm, older sibling-younger sibling relationship.
 Day also voices Young Rob in several flashbacks.
 Tim Stack as Lampy, an easily impressed yet slightly irascible tensor gooseneck desktop lamp stand. He is bright, but tends to be ironically dimwitted, though he has a couple of good points. During the storm scene, he nearly sacrifices his life, using himself as a lightning rod to power the clan's car battery. Lampy and Radio share a like-hate relationship and frequently get into arguments with each other, though their animosity lessens throughout the film.
 Stack also voiced a salesman named "Zeke".
 Jon Lovitz as Radio, a wisecracking vacuum-tube-based dial A.M. radiotelegraphic alarm clock with a personality that parodies loud and pretentious announcers. In a running gag, Radio and Lampy get into petty arguments.
 Jerry Rees as Radio's singing voice.
 Thurl Ravenscroft as Kirby, a very deep-voiced, individualistic upright vacuum cleaner who dons a cynical, cantankerous attitude towards the other appliances, though deep inside he loyally cares about them greatly.
 Wayne Kaatz as Master Rob McGroarty, the original human owner of the five appliances. After appearing as a child in flashbacks, Rob as an adult is leaving for college. While in the book, Rob plans to sell the cabin along with the appliances, in the film, Rob still has sentimentality towards appliances and takes them to college in the end.
 Colette Savage as Chris, Rob's tomboyish, supportive girlfriend.
 Phil Hartman, doing an impression of Jack Nicholson, as Air Conditioner, a sardonic air conditioner who resides in the cabin with the rest of the clan. He loses his temper while arguing with them, which causes him to overheat and explode, but is repaired by Rob near the end of the film.
 Hartman, doing an impression of Peter Lorre, also voiced the Hanging Lamp, a tensor desktop lamp stands with extension cords for arms in the spare parts shop.
 Joe Ranft as Elmo St. Peters, the owner of a spare appliance parts shop where he disassembles even his own appliances and sells the parts.
 Ranft also voices the evil clown in Toaster's nightmare.
 Beth Anderson as the Mae West-inspired magneto phone open-reel tape recorder in "It's a B-Movie" and the wooded wagon in "Worthless".
 Janice Liebhart as the fan in "It's a B-Movie", the phone in "Cutting Edge" and the pink convertible in "Worthless".
 Judy Toll, doing an impression of Joan Rivers, as Mishmash, a mish-mash hybrid device consisting of a can opener, a gooseneck desktop lamp stands and an electric shaver.
 Darryl Phinnessee as various characters in "It's a B-Movie" and "Cutting Edge" and the hearse in "Worthless".
 Jonathan Benair as TV, a black and white TV set who has moved to Rob's apartment and is an old member of the clan.
 Jim Jackman as Plugsy, a pear-shaped night table lamp stand who is one of the modern appliances that reside in Rob's apartment. While they were benevolent in the novel, in the film, they are initially jealous and antagonistic towards the clan.
 Mindy Stern as Rob's mother, who is an unseen character.
 Toll and Stern also voiced the Two-Faced Sewing Machine, who is one of the modern appliances that reside in Rob's apartment.
 Randy Bennett as Computer, who is the leader of the family of modern appliances that reside in Rob's apartment.
 Danny Mann as Stereo, who is one of the modern appliances that reside in Rob's apartment.
 Randall William Cook as Entertainment Complex, a stereophonic entertainment complex system who is one of the modern appliances that reside in Rob's apartment.
 Brian Cummings as the oven in "It's a B-Movie".
 Susie Allanson as the toaster oven in Rob's apartment.

Production

Conception and financing
The film rights to The Brave Little Toaster, the original novella by Thomas M. Disch, were purchased by the Walt Disney Studios in 1982, two years after its appearance in The Magazine of Fantasy and Science Fiction. After animators John Lasseter and Glen Keane had finished a short 2D/3D test film based on the book Where the Wild Things Are, Lasseter and producer Thomas L. Wilhite decided they wanted to produce a whole feature with the same technique.

The story they chose was The Brave Little Toaster, and this became the first CGI film Lasseter ever pitched. But in their enthusiasm, they ran into issues pitching the idea to two high-level Disney executives, animation administrator Ed Hansen, and Disney president Ron W. Miller. Ron Miller asked about the cost after the pitch and when Lasseter replied that it would cost no more than a traditionally animated film, Miller rejected the pitch, saying that the only reason to use computers would be if it was "faster or cheaper".

A few minutes after the meeting, Lasseter received a phone call from Hansen and was instructed to come down to his office, where Lasseter was informed that he was dismissed. Originally set to commence at the Disney studios with a budget of $18 million, development was then transferred to the new Hyperion Pictures, which had been created by former Disney employees Tom Wilhite and Willard Carroll, who took the production along with them after Wilhite successfully requested the project from then-president Ron Miller. As a result, the film was financed as an independent production by Disney, with the aid of electronics company TDK Corporation and video distributor CBS/Fox Video.

The budget was reduced by $12.06 million to $5.94 million as production began, approximately a third of the budget offered when in-house. Despite providing funds to get it off the ground, Disney was not involved with production of the film. Rees later commented that there were external forces at work that had the right to say this was a cheap film that could be shipped overseas, which the staff objected to and therefore were willing to make sacrifices to improve the quality of the film despite its limited budget.

Writing
In 1986, Hyperion began to work on the story and character development. Jerry Rees, a crew member on two previous Disney films, The Fox and the Hound and Tron, and co-writer of the screenplay along with Joe Ranft, was chosen to direct the project. He had been working on an animated adaptation of Will Eisner's The Spirit with Brad Bird, and received a call from Wilhite asking him to develop, write, and direct, explaining that The Brave Little Toaster was being adapted into a short, but that a feature film was possible if handled correctly. Joe Ranft and Rees worked on developing the story. The storyboards were designed by Jerry, Joe, along with Alex Mann and Darrell Rooney. When animators ran out of pages to storyboard, Rees sat down and wrote more of the script.

The work was significantly adapted from the original story. Only about four lines of dialogue from the book ended up in the finished film. Rees decided to move the junkyard sequence from the middle of the story to its end because of the junkyard's symbolism as a graveyard for appliances. He also wanted a definitive moment that earned Toaster the title of "brave", so he had Toaster jump into the gears to save the Master, a plot point that wasn't in the book. Having the character's voices in his head when writing the script helped Rees to personalize the dialogue. He even reworked some of the already-completed script in order to customize sections based on the actors' personalities. After cutting together the storyboards and scene-planning in Taipai, production manager Chuck Richardson explained the logistics issues—the film would be 110 minutes long. As a result, Rees decided to cut around 20 minutes' worth of the story—the deleted scenes have not been released to the public.

Casting
Rees was still in the process of writing when he decided to find actors. Many auditioners presented cartoony, exaggerated voices, which displeased him, because they did not believe their characters or bring a reality to the role. As a result, he sought out voice talent from The Groundlings improvisational group upon recommendation by Ranft, and he appreciated the honesty and naturalism they gave to their performances. Many of their members, including Jon Lovitz (Radio), Phil Hartman (Air Conditioner/Hanging Lamp), Tim Stack (Lampy), Judy Toll (Mishmash), and Mindy Sterling (Rob's mother) voiced characters in the film. Already established as an actor through Tony the Tiger and Dr. Seuss' How the Grinch Stole Christmas! Thurl Ravenscroft was cast as Kirby the vacuum cleaner. Heading the ensemble cast were Groundlings performer Deanna Oliver as Toaster, and newcomer Timothy E. Day as Blanky.

Oliver originally auditioned for Air Conditioner using a Bette Davis impression, but accepted the lead when offered. Rees, who had conceived Toaster as a female character, later recalled an anecdote where a crew member "slammed the door and walked out" because he had hired a woman to play the lead role. Day had never done acting work before, and had asked his mother to take him to auditions after becoming fascinated with a child actor voice-over.

Recording
Recording sessions did take place at Disney; the crew found and renovated a small derelict property in Hollywood. Rees's direction primarily consisted of ensuring the performances were as natural and realistic as possible. When recording, Rees first had each scene delivered as written, and then allowed the voice actors to play around with the dialogue and ended up using many of the improvised lines in the final film. Unusual for the time, some of the recordings were done in group sessions.

After being cast, Jon Lovitz got an opportunity to appear on Saturday Night Live. Because Rees had written the part of Radio specifically for Lovitz, he tried to find a way to keep Lovitz in the film. They ended up doing a marathon recording session, recording all of Lovitz's lines of dialogue in one night. Rees then stood in for Lovitz when the others were recording.

Rees described Timothy Day as an "amazing performer", who would ask about his character's motivation and the context of each scenario before recording his lines. Day was nicknamed "one-take Timmy" due to nailing the emotional truth of the text so quickly, such as crying loudly or delivering a line with a quiver in his voice. Comparing this film to the sequels, where a high note was dubbed by another singer due to being off-key, Oliver noted that in this film it would have been kept in due to being part of the character.

Animation
The crew initially worked on pre-production for six months in Los Angeles in 1985, and then a staff of ten people moved to Taiwan with Rees for another six months to work with Wang Film Productions Company Limited in Taipei (headed by James Wang) for the principal animation, then returned for a third six-month work period for post-production in the U.S. Rees's wife Rebecca was the film's directing animator, and she taught classes to the Taiwanese animators in order to improve the quality of their output.

The animators also had a mixture of ex-Disney employees and college graduates from CalArts. Every day, they had to do what would normally be done across a two-week period at Disney. The colour stylist was veteran Disney animator A. Kendall O'Connor, a member of Disney's feature animation department from its first feature Snow White and the Seven Dwarfs, and Oliver likened the light-hearted frog sequence to Merrie Melodies. A massive TDK sign was included by Rees as the company was a big sponsor. The animators used many visual cues to help inform the audience about plot and character. For example, during the nightmare sequence at the beginning of the film, Toaster burns toast and emits smoke, which symbolizes guilt and fear of being responsible.

They deduced toasters would be afraid of things like forks and falling into the bathtub while plugged in, so they included them in this sequence. Oliver described the transition from bathtub sparks to lightning outside the house as proper filmmaking. Similarly, Blanky being a certain shade of yellow bears significance to the plot. In the beginning of their journey, the other characters dismiss him, even Toaster. Then Toaster encounters a flower that is the same color, who also wants to snuggle. After explaining it is just a reflection, he walks away, thereby making the flower wilt. The next moment shows Toaster proactively rescuing Blanky. The idea is that the flower informs Toaster that his actions will make Blanky wilt too.

Music and sound
The film score of The Brave Little Toaster was composed and conducted by David Newman and performed by the New Japan Philharmonic. Newman's score for this movie was one of his earlier works and apparently one that he felt very close to. He did not view it as a cheerful one and decided to give the film a dramatic score to reinforce the serious nature of many of the film's themes. Rees admired his "rich, classical style", and chose him so that the film wouldn't have "cartoon music". Rees stated that Newman would attempt to get into the headspace of the characters and thought in the terms of the inanimate objects being real characters.

Rees said that Newman's score was as "grand as anything he would ever do", rather than composing the music differently due to the medium being animation. He wove death, joy, love, loss, and struggle into the work. Newman's composing style was influenced by his philosophy that behind every "chord of joy" lies an element of sadness, whether it being the knowledge it won't last forever, that it is a facade for a deeper emotion, or that joy itself comes from sadness. He used lush strings in the opening scenes to convey a sense of longing. As the characters are introduced, the score becomes more lively, and each character has their own theme, influenced by their personality. For example, Kirby is a grumpy and old vacuum cleaner, and so Newman provides a theme consisting of low chords, whereas Radio was given a brassy fanfare to reflect his self-important personality. These musical motifs wove their way into the entire movie score.

At some points, the style of music was used to provoke an emotional response, for example when the Air Conditioner breaks down, the orchestra first trembles and then bursts with energy. After this the music returns to a somber tone, as the appliances start to realize that there is truth to what he said. When they explore the outside world for the first time, the music fills with a "pastoral grandeur", and when they enter the woods, strings, flutes, bells and brass are used to convey the simultaneous magic and danger of the outdoors. The film also contains a Busby Berkeley Italian opera-esque sequence containing a fish. The score was finally given a limited release in 2004. The film contains four original songs ("City of Light", "It's a B-Movie", "Cutting Edge", and "Worthless") that were written by Van Dyke Parks. Rees "felt uncomfortable with the full Broadway book musical approach", and his philosophy was that the songs should be part of the action and plot without stopping for a big production number.

Rees specifically wanted characters to be able to break out into song whenever they wanted to, similar to the films of the Hollywood Golden Age. Once they were written, Newman used the songs in his own score. For example, the first song in the film, "City of Light", displays the character's naivety and apprehension, and contains a motif that gets more complex as the film goes on. This approach made the score more cohesive. "It's a B-Movie" is filled with black humor and an ominous pipe organ as the mutant appliances scare the main characters. The synthesizer driven "Cutting Edge" sees the master's state-of-the-art appliances boast about how great they are. The poignant number "Worthless" is a track filled with piano, strings, guitar, and vocals which are abruptly cut off when the singing cars are crushed. The junkyard sequence's climax evokes feelings of desperation, danger, suspense and real-world peril. Newman "reprises the score's subtle and varied themes over the end credits". Newman wrote and orchestrated the score over a 50-hour period, which included embarking on a 12-hour flight to Japan to record with the orchestra in Maeda Hall.

The New Japan Philharmonic gave the score a "luxurious sound" that was impressive given the limited resources available. The sound effects were not from a library, and were instead, exclusively made Foley sounds, with various real-world objects around Los Angeles being used in the score, such as objects in antique stores. This technique was used because Rees wanted to create new characters with new sounds. The sound mixers, including former Disney studio mixer Shawn Murphy who recorded the score, asked how they would do their job due to the film being animated, and Rees explained that they should mix it like any other film, instead of thinking of it like it were a cartoon.

Music
David Newman composed the score, with Van Dyke Parks on the songs' music and lyrics. In most of the songs, Beth Anderson, Janice Liebhart, and Darryl Phinnessee perform the singing voices of various background characters, while also doubling as the chorus. In addition, the songs "Tutti Frutti" and "My Mammy" are played by the character Radio during the film.

Songs
Original songs performed in the film include:

Themes
Director Jerry Rees described the main message is the film asks is: "what would it be like to be an appliance, and feel good when you're useful, and help people..."? He also explained that the film's themes included a "fear of being abandoned and wanting to be reunited with somebody that you love..."—the opposing forces of feeling like you're worthless and the joy of redemption. Another important notion was that of "valuing things from the past and taking them...into the future", both in terms of objects and relationships. All of the main characters have personalities that are unique twists on the appliance functionality.

Blanky is an electric security blanket but is insecure without its owner, the bright Lampy is mentally dim, Kirby is supposed to hold everything inside but has a nervous breakdown, Toaster is warm and reflective so can easily empathize, and Radio is constantly switched on and entertaining. He has the philosophy that despite being inanimate, they each symbolized things we actually feel. As the foundation for writing the story, Rees reasoned that the characters would only be happy if they were being used by the Master. As a result of this, a major aspect of the film is about inanimate objects becoming alive when you are not observing them.

As opposed to other films of the time, The Brave Little Toaster was able to include dark, scary, edgy, or risqué content due to being an independent feature. They were able to explore the "wouldn't it be fun if" places that Disney wouldn't allow. They rejected the false dichotomy of being joke-driven or overly sincere, and instead incorporated both elements as that is how real conversations work.

Release and home media
The film's premiere was at Wadsworth Theatre in Los Angeles on July 13, 1987. With the producer help, the film premiered in various festivals, including the Los Angeles International Animation Celebration in 1987, and the Sundance Film Festival in 1988. It made history as the first original animated film ever exhibited at Sundance (Faith Hubley's The Cosmic Eye, a compilation film featuring several shorts she made with spouse John Hubley, was screened in the 1986 festival) and remained the only one until 2001's Waking Life.

Though the prize went to Rob Nilsson's Heat and Sunlight, before the awards ceremony, Rees claims he was told by the judges that they considered Toaster the best film, but they decided not to give the award to a cartoon as they considered people would not take the festival seriously afterwards. Though it is sometimes thought that the film was not released in cinemas because it failed to find a distributor, in reality arthouse film distributor Skouras Pictures took on the distributing rights for the theatrical release, and was going to do evening screenings, noting it was more for college and young adult than kids.

However, Disney, who had invested in the video and television rights, according to Rees did not want competition so moved their television premiere date up and ended up preventing it from being financially successful in theatres, forcing Skouras to withdraw their deal. The film premiered on the Disney Channel on February 27, 1988. To compensate, Hyperion continued its plan to enter the film into various festivals and managed to secure limited theatrical airings at arthouse facilities across the United States, such as spending two weeks at New York's Film Forum in May 1989, and shortly in Washington, D.C. in March 1990. 

Rees thinks most people discovered the film through syndication on the Disney Channel, or through home video releases. In July 1991, Walt Disney Home Video released the film to home video format via VHS and Laserdisc. In the UK, the VHS tapes were released under PolyGram Video (1990s) and Carlton Video (2000s), while in Australia, Roadshow Home Video held the rights. ITC Entertainment syndicated the film internationally as of the NATPE 1991 TV trade show.

In Spain, Divisa Home Video and Aurum Produccines were in charge of distribution, the former during the 2000s. Disney's VHS was re-printed throughout the '90s onward, and it enjoyed popularity as a rental amongst children. The DVD was released in September 2003, to tie in with the film's 15th anniversary. In the UK, Prism Leisure Corporation was in charge of distribution. Their license has since expired, but the disc can still be found on UK shopping sites. Disney's releases commonly use a LaserDisc transfer from the early 1990s, while Prism Leisure's DVD uses a fresh transfer from an international print.

While the sequels, The Brave Little Toaster to the Rescue and The Brave Little Toaster Goes to Mars, are available, the original film has yet to appear on Disney+, or any video on demand services for that matter.

Reception and legacy
The film has garnered a 77% rating on the reviews website Rotten Tomatoes based on 13 reviews, with a weighted average of 7.31/10. Mary Houlihan-Skilton of Chicago Sun-Times gave a positive review, but found a problem with the storytellers using caricatures of Bette Davis, Peter Lorre, Jack Nicholson, Mae West, Joan Rivers and others to portray them. This became so old that it has been used forever and should be given a rest.

The Washington Post called it "a kid's film made without condescension", while The New York Times said "visually the movie has a smooth-flowing momentum and a lush storybook opulence". Time Out said the film had "a winning combination of inventive characters, amusing dialogue, excellent voice-overs, likeable tune and first-rate animation". Deseret News wrote it is "a wonder of the movie industry...a funny, occasionally thrilling animated feature aimed at kids, but with a sophisticated sensibility intended to reach their parents as well". Halliwell's Film Guide called it an "odd fantasy of pots and pans with no more than adequate animation".

Projection Booth, Film Freak Central, Arizona Daily Star, and Leonard Maltin all gave the film similar praise, describing it as "among the finest animated films Disney never made", "Blade Runner for children", "an overlooked classic [and] utterly rewatchable fable", and "a real breath of fresh air in contemporary cartoons" respectively. Needcoffee.com gave the film a 4/5, writing that despite a questionable premise, "it's an actually cute and extremely fun animated flick". Las Vegas Review-Journal, Movie Mom at Yahoo! Movies, and eFilmCritic.com all gave the same score, the latter describing it as a "perfectly charming kid's flick about adventuring appliances". Northwest Herald gave a 3/5, EmanuelLevy.Com and Talking Pictures gave a 2/5 rating.

This film is unique in that it attracted a substantial amount of talent from both old and new sources. Many of the cast and crew members went on to have successful careers in the animation industry. Co-writer Joe Ranft became a script supervisor at Pixar, while animators Kirk Wise and Kevin Lima went on to animate and co-direct films of the Disney Renaissance, such as The Little Mermaid, Beauty and the Beast, Aladdin, Pocahontas, The Hunchback of Notre Dame and Tarzan. Effects animator Mark Dindal directed Disney's The Emperor's New Groove and Chicken Little, as well as Warner Bros.' Cats Don't Dance. Character designer Rob Minkoff directed The Lion King, Stuart Little, Stuart Little 2, Mr. Peabody & Sherman and Paws of Fury: The Legend of Hank. After directing a financially unsuccessful film The Marrying Man in 1991, Jerry Rees went on to direct Disney theme park films. Voice actors Jon Lovitz and Phil Hartman wound their way onto animated series such as The Simpsons and The Critic. Many have noted that this film shares similarities to the Toy Story franchise, also worked on by John Lasseter. Rees saw it as "the next inanimate object feature".

The Brave Little Toaster was followed by two sequels a decade later: The Brave Little Toaster Goes to Mars and The Brave Little Toaster to the Rescue. The latter (Mars) is based on the sequel to Disch's novella while the former (Rescue) is a brand new story. While reuniting most of the cast, they had a new director and crew. Rees noted that the original film was made out of pure love and not thought of as a kids' film or a product, and that he had heard the new approach was a more commercial venture. Deanna Oliver felt that despite Ramirez being a talented director who handled the franchise with care, instead of "film" and "character-driven", the project seemed more about getting it done because it could be made. Neither Rees nor Oliver have watched the finished sequels.

In 2006, the official website of Hyperion Pictures posted an image of a possible fourth film in CGI, but that film was never produced. The website has been inactive since then but was recently updated in 2019. Waterman Entertainment planned a remake, but was never produced.

Despite its limited release, the cult following  of the film has seen the cast and crew get substantial recognition throughout the world. Rees recalled a situation where a person he was doing an online project with messaged him on IMDb, discovering his work on TBLT, and explained how deeply the film affected him due to teaching life lessons. He appreciated this genuine reaction from a real person. Oliver went to the Afghanistan deployment ceremony for her son in June 2010, and he had told Brave Company his mother played Toaster, so they brought toasters with them for her to sign, which the soldiers took to the country with them. She also received fan art from one of the soldiers. The consensus among people who worked on the film such as Tom Wilhite and Donald Kushner is that the original is the one that has the cult following as opposed to the sequels. Rees said that when his future Pixar friends saw the film, they appreciated it despite the animation due to the heavy financial and time constraints.

Awards and nominations

|-
| 1988
| The Brave Little Toaster
| Primetime Emmy Award for Outstanding Animated Program
| 
|-
| 1988
| Jerry Rees
| Sundance Film Festival Grand Jury Prize, Dramatic
| 
|-
| 1988
| The Brave Little Toaster
| Special Jury Recognition
|  
|-
| 1988
| The Brave Little Toaster
| Parent's Choice Award
| 
|}

See also 
 Toy Story
 Tin Toy
 Arthouse animation

References

 Beck, Jerry (2005). The Animated Movie Guide. Chicago Reader Press. . Retrieved March 29, 2007.
 Datlow, Ellen and Windling, Terri (2001). The Year's Best Fantasy and Horror. St. Martin's Press. . Retrieved March 29, 2007.

External links

 Information at Disney.com
 
 
 
 
 The Brave Little Toaster at Jerry Rees website
 24 page analysis of The Brave Little Toaster history

 
1987 films
1987 animated films
1980s American animated films
1980s fantasy adventure films
American children's animated adventure films
American children's animated fantasy films
American children's animated musical films
American fantasy adventure films
American musical fantasy films
Animated films based on novels
Disney animated films
1980s English-language films
Films based on American novels
Films with screenplays by Joe Ranft
Films with screenplays by Jim Ryan (writer)
Films scored by David Newman
Films directed by Jerry Rees
Hyperion Pictures films
1980s children's animated films
Films set in the United States
Films set in California
Films with screenplays by Jerry Rees
Films produced by Donald Kushner
The Kushner-Locke Company films
Sundance Film Festival award winners
American independent films